The 1977 Copa del Rey Final was the 75th final of the Copa del Rey. It was played at the Vicente Calderón Stadium in Madrid on 25 June 1977, with Real Betis defeating Athletic Bilbao in a penalty shoot-out after a 2–2 draw.

Road to the final

Match

References

External links
 RSSSF.com

1977
1976–77 in Spanish football
Real Betis matches
Athletic Bilbao matches
Association football penalty shoot-outs